ISCC may refer to:

 Integrated solar combined cycle, a form of electric power generation
 Inter-Service Chess Championship, a chess tournament sponsored by the United States Department of Defense
 Inter-Society Color Council, a US trade organization
 International Sustainability and Carbon Certification
 Islamic Supreme Council of Canada, based in Calgary, Alberta
 IEEE Symposium on Computers and Communications, held by the IEEE Communications Society
 Invasive Species Council of California, a state inter-agency council involved with Invasive species in the United States

See also
 ISC (disambiguation)
 ISSCC
 ISSC (disambiguation)